The Finnish word Väiski may refer to:

 Headgear worn by Finnish Scouts
 FFR/Väiski, a Finnish football club in the SPL Helsingin piiri